is a Japanese web manga series written and illustrated by Kokone Nata. It has been serialized on the Pixiv website since February 2019, with its chapters collected into five tankōbon volumes as of October 2022. An anime television series adaptation by Pierrot premiered in October 2022. A television drama adaptation is set to premiere in April 2023.

Characters

Hayate is a 20-year-old university student majoring in economics. He gets embarrassed whenever he becomes clumsy. He loves animals and enjoys reading. 

Shun is a 17-year-old high school student who is athletic. He tends to pretend whatever clumsy action he has done was made on purpose. He enjoys playing sports.

Mima is a 27-year-old salaryman who is seen as a mascot by his co-workers. He tends to be unfazed and oblivious whenever he becomes clumsy. He is childhood friends with Motoharu. 

Sōma is a 19-year-old vocational student studying at a vocational design school. He tends to be positive whenever he does something clumsy.

Igarashi is a 27-year-old author and a friend of Mima's from elementary school. He is described as a genius who can be clumsy as well.

Asami is Shun's older sister and the owner of the cafe Hayate and Sōma work at.

Sōta is Mima's superior at work and Sōma's older brother.

Production
While the manga series is in full color, Kokone Nata can color one page in about 30 minutes so she can finish the coloring work of 19 pages within one day.

Media

Manga
Written and illustrated by Kokone Nata, Play It Cool, Guys started as a series of illustrations published on the author's Twitter account since May 11, 2018, before being serialized as a web manga on Pixiv on February 23, 2019. The manga has also been serialized on Pixiv's Pixiv Comic service. As of October 2022, five tankōbon volumes have been released by Square Enix under its Gangan Comics Pixiv imprint. In North America, Yen Press is publishing the series in English.

Volume list

Novel
A novel adaptation written by Shino Kaida, titled Cool Doji Danshi: Connect It Cool, Guys, was published by Square Enix on March 21, 2020.

Anime
An anime television series adaptation was announced on April 22, 2022. It is produced by Pierrot and directed by Chiaki Kon, with scripts written by Makoto Uezu, and music composed by Masato Nakayama. Eri Taguchi is handling the character designs and serving as chief animation director. The series premiered on October 11, 2022, on TV Tokyo, AT-X, and BS11. It will run for two cours, and will consist of 15-minute episodes. Crunchyroll licensed the series.

A two-episode spin-off anime, titled Petit Cool Doji Danshi no Hitokoma, premiered on NTT Docomo's  streaming service on March 21 and March 28, 2023. It is produced by Aqua Aris, with Yū Hayata directing and providing the character designs, and Mao Emura writing the screenplay.

Episode list

Drama
A television drama adaptation was announced on February 24, 2023. It will be directed by Hiroaki Yuasa, Yuka Eda, and Akina Yanagi, based on a screenplay by Hiroyuki Komine. The series is set to premiere on April 15, 2023, on TV Tokyo.

Reception
In 2019, the manga was ranked 16th in Takarajimasha's Kono Manga ga Sugoi! guidebook for best manga series in 2019 for female readers, placed 7th in Pixiv and Nippon Shuppan Hanbai's Web Manga General Election, and was placed 16th in the Next Manga Awards.

Notes

References

External links
  
 

2023 anime ONAs
Anime series based on manga
Comedy anime and manga
Crunchyroll anime
Gangan Comics manga
Japanese webcomics
Josei manga
Pierrot (company)
Slice of life anime and manga
Television shows written by Makoto Uezu
TV Tokyo original programming
Webcomics in print
Yen Press titles